The Organ Pipes is a notable rock cliffs on the northwest side of Jaeger Table, south of Cairn Ridge, in the Dufek Massif, Pensacola Mountains. The name is suggested by the appearance of the feature caused by weathering along prominent vertical joints in the gabbro rock. Named by Arthur B. Ford, United States Geological Survey (USGS) geologist, leader of the USGS Pensacola Mountains survey party, 1978–79.

Cliffs of Queen Elizabeth Land